Vadym Vyacheslavovych Strashkevych (born 21 April 1994) is a Ukrainian amateur football midfielder who plays for Nyva Vinnytsia.

Career
Strashkevych is the product of the UFK Lviv School System. He made his debut for FC Karpaty entering as a second-half substitute against FC Illichivets Mariupol on 2 August 2013 in Ukrainian Premier League.

He also played for Ukrainian under-17 and Ukrainian under-20 national football teams.

References

External links
 
 

1994 births
Living people
People from Kalynivka
Ukrainian footballers
Association football defenders
Ukrainian expatriate footballers
FC Karpaty Lviv players
NK Veres Rivne players
FC Poltava players
FC Volyn Lutsk players
Resovia (football) players
FC Mynai players
FC Bukovyna Chernivtsi players
FC Karpaty Halych players
Ukrainian Premier League players
Ukrainian First League players
Ukrainian Second League players
II liga players
Expatriate footballers in Poland
Ukrainian expatriate sportspeople in Poland
Sportspeople from Vinnytsia Oblast